In mathematics, Turán's inequalities are some inequalities for Legendre polynomials found by  (and first published by ).

If  is the th Legendre polynomial, Turán's inequalities state that

For Hn, the nth Hermite polynomial, Turán's inequalities are

whilst for Chebyshev polynomials they are

See also
Askey–Gasper inequality
Sturm Chain

References
 
 

Orthogonal polynomials
Inequalities